Pontibacter humi  is a Gram-negative, aerobic, rod-shaped and non-motile bacterium from the genus of Pontibacter which has been isolated from mountain soil in Korea.

References 

Cytophagia
Bacteria described in 2015